ACG Parnell College is an independent co-educational facility and is part of ACG Schools, whose New Zealand schools are members of the Independent Schools of New Zealand (ISNZ). The school is located in the suburb of Parnell in Auckland, New Zealand. The school offers the Cambridge Assessment International Education (CAIE) and International Baccalaureate. The school is also a member of the Association of Cambridge Schools in New Zealand. ACG Parnell College is split up into four campuses - Early Learning School on 110 Park Road, Primary School Campuses on 39 George Street, Middle School Campus on 2 Titoki Street (Main ACG Parnell College building) and a Senior Campus on 9 Davis Crescent.

History
ACG Parnell College (formerly ACG Junior College) was founded in 1998 and originally provided education for students in Years 7 to 10. In 2007 the college was redeveloped, renamed and expanded to offer places at Years 1 to 13.

In 2019 ACG Parnell College opened its new expansion of the college, named ACG Senior Campus. The unique pre-university styled campus is located on 9 Davis Crescent, Newmarket. The campus offers both Cambridge International Examinations and The International Baccalaureate. The new Senior Campus serves Year 12 and 13 only. In July 2020, an Early Learning School was opened.

School leadership
Mr Larne Edmeades was the school's former Principal,  appointed in 2005. Edmeades worked with staff to establish and develop the new ACG campus and left the college at the end of 2016, leaving Mr Ed Coup as the Acting Principal. In early June 2017, Mr Russell Brooke became the Principal and left the school on 1 March 2020, leaving Mr Damian Watson as the current Principal.

The Principal is in charge of the primary school and college. At ACG Parnell College, the Senior Leadership Team consists of the Principal, two Deputy Principals, an Associate Principal and an Assistant Principal (Pastoral).

The school employs approximately 100 teachers and more than 20 administrative staff.

Curriculum
ACG Parnell College offers Cambridge Assessment International Education (CAIE) for Year 11-13. From 2019, due to the merge with ACG Senior College, ACG Parnell College also offered the International Baccalaureate Diploma Programme (IBDP).  The International Baccalaureate Diploma Programme (IBDP) was no longer available from 2022 and the school's last IB cohort (Year 13) will be graduating in December 2023.

Advanced Maths is available for Years 9 and 10. Advanced Science is available for Year 10. Students taking Advanced Maths and Science in Year 10 will sit the Cambridge IGCSE Exams in November (IGCSE Exams are normally taken in Year 11). 

All Year 5 students learn Spanish and all Year 6 students learn French, or to have extra English support. From Year 7, students can choose to take either Spanish or Chinese (Mandarin). Language is compulsory up to and including Year 10.

Demographics
Last visited by Education Review Office (ERO) on 29 November 2019.

The current school roll is around 1450 with students in Years 1 to 13, with a maximum of 28 students in each class. There are approximately 45% girls and 55% boys at the school. The ethnic composition was 21% New Zealand European, 30% Chinese, 8% Indian and 41% other ethnic groups (the prioritised ethnicity method has been used to handle people with multiple ethnicities).

Notable alumni
Jennie, member of K-pop girl group Blackpink.

References

External links
School website

Primary schools in Auckland
Secondary schools in Auckland
Private schools in New Zealand
Cambridge schools in New Zealand
Parnell, New Zealand